Valcon Games was a developer and publisher of video games based in Bellevue, Washington, United States.

The company was founded in 2005 by Colin Gordon and Glen Halseth, both former members of Kemco. Valcon published games that are overlooked for the US market and also localizes games from other territories. Their last game release was in 2011 and their web site is no longer online.

Games released

References

External links
 Valcon Games official website (archived from the original)

Companies based in Bellevue, Washington
Video game companies of the United States
Video game development companies
Video game publishers
Video game companies established in 2005
2005 establishments in Washington (state)